Ketil Trout, known in Old Norse as Ketill hængr (Modern Icelandic Ketil Hæng), is the name of several figures from Norse folklore. Two are especially prominent:

 Ketil Trout of Hranista, also known as Ketil Trout of Halogaland, the hero of the legendary Ketils saga hœngs
 his grandson, Ketil Trout of Namdalen, a chieftain in early 10th century Iceland